Ivanis may refer to:

People 
 Ivaniš (magnate), Serbian magnate (despot), Dušan's relative, governor in Toplica
 Ivaniš Berislavić (died 1514), Despot of Serbia
 Ivaniš Horvat (died 1394), Croatian nobleman
 Ivaniš Korvin (1473–1504), illegitimate son of Matthias Corvinus, King of Hungary
 Ivaniš Nelipić (1379–1435), Croatian nobleman
 Ivaniš Paližna (died 1391), Croatian knight

Places 
Ivăniș, a village in Întregalde, Romania